Asociația Sportivă Minerul Cavnic, commonly known as AS Minerul Cavnic or as Minerul Cavnic, was a Romanian football club based in Cavnic, Maramureș County, founded in 1934 and re-founded in 2001, just to be dissolved in 2017. During the 1970s and 1980s, financially supported by the mining industry, the club was a constant presence in the Divizia C and at its best, reached even the Divizia B.

History
The club was founded in 1934 and played, until 1971, in the county football leagues. At the end of the 1970–71 season, Minerul Cavnic won the promotion to Divizia C, the third tier of Romanian football.

After only two seasons, Minerul Cavnic gained the promotion to Divizia B, finishing the 1972–73 season on the second place, which assured a second division place in the next season. After relegating at the end of the season, Minerul won the promotion back in 1976, but relegated again.

The team established itself as a Divizia B regular after the 1977–78 season, when Minerul promoted for the third time in the second division and managed to avoid relegation back to Divizia C for the first time. After this third promotion, Minerul played nine consecutive editions in the second division, finishing two times on the sixth position, their all-time best performance.

The team relegated at the end of 1986–87 season, returned again after just one season to the second division, but then relegated to Divizia C. Minerul played in the third tier until 1996, when the team relegated in Divizia D. Since then, the team plays in the fourth division.

Honours

Leagues 
Liga III
Winners (4): 1975–76, 1977–78, 1987–88, 1990–91
Runners-up (2): 1972–73, 1974–75

Liga IV – Maramureș County
Winners (1): 1970–71

Other performances 
Appearances in Liga II: 13
Best finish in Liga II: 6th  (1979–80, 1982–83)
Appearances in Liga III: 12

References

External links
 Cavnic sport news

Association football clubs established in 1934
Association football clubs disestablished in 2017
Defunct football clubs in Romania
Football clubs in Maramureș County
Liga II clubs
Liga III clubs
Liga IV clubs
Mining association football teams in Romania
1934 establishments in Romania
2017 disestablishments in Romania